Pavel Aleksandrovich Brutt (born 29 January 1982) is a Russian former professional track and road bicycle racer, who rode professionally between 2001 and 2017 for six different teams.

Career
Born in Sosnovy Bor, Leningrad Oblast, Brutt's biggest win of his career was stage 5 in the 2008 Giro d'Italia. He also won the Russian National Road Race Championships in 2011. In August 2014  announced that Brutt would join them for the 2015 season.

Major results
Source: 

2000
 6th Road race, UCI Junior Road World Championships
2001
 1st Stage 1 Vuelta al Táchira
 1st Stage 2 Circuito Montañés
 5th Overall International Tour of Rhodes
 9th Overall Vuelta a Venezuela
1st Young rider classification
1st Stage 11
2002
 2nd Circuito de Getxo
2004
 4th Overall Circuito Montañés
1st Points classification
1st Stage 2
2005
 1st Overall Vuelta a Navarra
1st Points classification
1st Stage 5b (ITT)
 2nd Overall Volta a Lleida
 4th Overall Vuelta a Extremadura
1st Stage 3b (ITT)
 5th Subida a Urkiola
 6th Overall Circuito Montañés
2006
 1st Overall Cinturón a Mallorca
1st Stage 5
 1st  Overall Tour of Greece
1st Stage 2
 Circuito Montañés
1st Mountains classification
1st Stage 5
 2nd Overall Vuelta a Navarra
 3rd Overall Tour de Bretagne
 3rd Overall Volta a Lleida
1st Stage 3
 4th Paris–Mantes-en-Yvelines
 8th Overall Five Rings of Moscow
 10th Overall Vuelta a la Comunidad de Madrid
2007
 1st Gran Premio di Chiasso
 2nd Eindhoven Team Time Trial
 4th Memorial Cimurri
 5th Gran Premio Città di Camaiore
 7th Overall Tour de Langkawi
1st Stage 9
 7th Giro del Veneto
2008
 1st Stage 5 Giro d'Italia
 9th Monte Paschi Eroica
2009
 1st Tour de Vendée
 2nd Overall Tour de Wallonie
 5th Giro del Veneto
2011
 1st  Road race, National Road Championships
 1st Classica Sarda
 2nd Giro del Friuli
 5th Trofeo Laigueglia
 8th Overall Giro di Sardegna
 8th Overall Tour de Romandie
1st Stage 1
2012
 1st Volta Limburg Classic
 3rd Road race, National Road Championships
 4th Rund um Köln
2014
 5th Road race, National Road Championships
2015
 National Road Championships
2nd Road race
3rd Time trial
2016
 2nd Time trial, National Road Championships

Grand Tour general classification results timeline

References

External links

Pavel Brutt profile at 

1982 births
Living people
People from Sosnovy Bor, Leningrad Oblast
Russian male cyclists
Russian Giro d'Italia stage winners
Vuelta a Venezuela stage winners
Sportspeople from Leningrad Oblast